Zsuzsa Kovács (born 13 November 1945) is a retired Hungarian swimmer who won a bronze medal in the 4×100 m freestyle relay at the 1962 European Aquatics Championships. She competed in the 4×100 m medley relay and 200 m breaststroke events at the 1964 Summer Olympics, but did not reach the finals.

References

External links 
 
 

1945 births
Living people
Swimmers at the 1964 Summer Olympics
Olympic swimmers of Hungary
Hungarian female breaststroke swimmers
European Aquatics Championships medalists in swimming
People from Hódmezővásárhely
Sportspeople from Csongrád-Csanád County
20th-century Hungarian women
21st-century Hungarian women
Hungarian female freestyle swimmers